Le Tallud is a village and commune in the Deux-Sèvres department of the Nouvelle-Aquitaine region in western France. It is situated on the River Thouet some 5 km west of the town of Parthenay.

The commune of Le Tallud has joined together with 38 neighbouring communes to establish the Communauté de communes de Parthenay-Gâtine which provides a framework within which local tasks are carried out together.

See also
Communes of the Deux-Sèvres department

References

Communes of Deux-Sèvres